Abdallah ibn Yahya, better known by his laqab of Talib al-Haqq, was the leader of an Ibadi revolt against the Umayyad Caliphate in southern Arabia during the Third Fitna.

He was of Kindaite origin, and had originally been appointed by the Umayyad governor of Yemen as a judge in the 
eastern Hadramawt region.  In 745, as Umayyad authority was shaken by the outbreak of the Third Fitna, he proclaimed himself caliph. He secured the support from the Ibadi Kharijites of neighbouring Oman, and captured the Yemeni capital, Sana'a. His army, under his follower Abu Hamza, reached as far as Mecca and Medina, and even Basra for a while swore allegiance to him. His followers are said to have numbered 30,000, although that figure may be just a conventional number indicating a large multitude rather than an accurate count.

The uprising was suppressed in 747 by the Umayyad general Abd al-Malik ibn Atiyya, sent by Caliph Marwan II.

References

Sources
 

8th-century Arabs
8th-century caliphs
8th century in Yemen
Kinda
People of the Third Fitna
Ibadi Muslims
Yemen under the Umayyad Caliphate